Giovanni Romero was an Italian colonel who participated in several conflicts during the 19th century. He participated in the Second Italian War of Independence and the Third Italian War of Independence, most notably leading the 4th Africa Infantry Regiment during the Battle of Adwa of the First Italo-Ethiopian War before being killed at the battle. Romero was also a posthumous recipient of the Gold Medal of Military Valour.

Italian Wars of Independence
Giovanni was born on March 8, 1841, at Mortara, Lombardy as the son of Giuseppe Romero and Maddalena Gabetti. He volunteered within the 11th Infantry Regiment on June 24, 1859, during the Second Italian War of Independence. Romero proceeded to participate at the Battle of San Martino and for his service at the battle, he was awarded the Silver Medal of Military Valour as well as a promotion to Second Lieutenant of the 15th Infantry Regiment. He then partook in campaigns within Umbria after Sardinia annexed the Grand Duchy of Tuscany. He was subsequently transferred to the 1st Bersaglieri Infantry Regiment and promoted to Captain on June 7, 1866, and returned to the 51st Infantry Regiment and then participated in the Third Italian War of Independence. During the Battle of Custoza, Romero launched an ambitious charge at the Austrian lines, managing to capture Belvedere along with several soldiers, including 4 officers. For this, he was awarded the Knight's Cross of the Military Order of Savoy.

Service in Eritrea and Adwa
In 1873, when the corps of Alpine troops had been formed, it was assigned to the companies of the Cuneo District and Romero was promoted in 1883 while commanding a battalion of the 42nd Infantry Regiment. In November 1889, as a Lieutenant Colonel, he became a teacher at the Caserta Non-commissioned Officers School for 4 years. He was promoted to Colonel on March 1894 and commanded the 29th Infantry Regiment. When relations between Italy and Ethiopia began to sour, Romero adamantly left Naples on December 30, 1895, to arrive at Massawa on January 1896. There, he was given commands of battalions VII, VIII, IX and XI of the 4th African Infantry Regiment of the 3rd Reserve Brigade. During the Battle of Adwa, when the Brigade was set to capture Colle Rebbi Arienni, the Brigade suddenly found themselves being overwhelmed by the Shaan hordes as they managed to collapse the entire Italian positions. In a last attempt to defend the road to Colle Rebbi Arienni, Romero spread his battalions out but was killed in a hand-to-hand duel.

Medal Citation
Two years later, the Italian government posthumously awarded Romero with the Gold Medal of Military Valour. It's citation read:

Legacy
A street in Mortara is named after Romero.

References

1841 births
1896 deaths
Italian Army officers
Recipients of the Silver Medal of Military Valor
Recipients of the Gold Medal of Military Valor
Italian military personnel of the First Italo-Ethiopian War
Italian military personnel killed in the First Italo-Ethiopian War